The Christians may refer to:

 The Christians (band), a soul band from Liverpool, England
The Christians (album), 1987
 The Christians (political party), now Christian Party of Austria, a minor Austrian political party
 The Christians (Norway), a minor Norwegian political party

See also
 Christian (disambiguation), including The Christian
 Christians, people who follow or adhere to Christianity